The Greater Northern Football League (GNFL) was an Australian rules football competition played between the fifteen (15) major football clubs across Northern Tasmania from the two major footballing bodies across the north of the state, the Northern Tasmanian Football Association (NTFA), and the North West Football Union (NWFU) in 1981 and 1982.

Participating clubs

NTFA Clubs
 - City-South Football Club.
 - East Launceston Football Club.
 - Launceston Football Club.
 - Longford Football Club.
 - North Launceston Football Club.
 - Scottsdale Football Club.

NWFU Clubs
 - Burnie Tigers Football Club.
 - Cooee Football Club.
 - Devonport Football Club.
 - East Devonport Football Club.
 - Latrobe Football Club.
 - Penguin Football Club.
 - Smithton Football Club.
 - Ulverstone Football Club.
 - Wynyard Football Club.

1982 Ladder 
																	
																	
NWFU FINALS																	
 																	

																	
NTFA FINALS

See also
 Australian rules football in Tasmania

Defunct Australian rules football competitions in Tasmania